Do Chahi (also Romanized as Do Chāhī) is a village in Jangal Rural District, Jangal District, Roshtkhar County, Razavi Khorasan Province, Iran. At the 2006 census, its population was 296, in 56 families.

References 

Populated places in Roshtkhar County